Bamfordvirae is a kingdom of viruses. This kingdom is recognized for its use of double jelly roll major capsid proteins. It was formerly known as the PRD1-adenovirus lineage. The kingdom is named after Dennis H. Bamford who first promoted the evolutionary unity of all viruses encoding double jelly-roll major capsid proteins.

Taxonomy
The following phyla are recognized:
Nucleocytoviricota
Preplasmiviricota

References